Madelene Olivier Van Aardt (14 August 1896 – 6 July 1982) was a South African composer, teacher, and pianist. She was one of the few women to compose songs in the Afrikaans language.

Van Aardt was born in Graaff-Reinet. She earned a Diploma Associate from Trinity College London, then returned to South Africa to live in Somerset East.

Van Aardt collaborated with composer and pianist Felix de Cola on several of her works. Her music was published by Voortrekkerpers and Ardmore & Beechwood Ltd., and included on at least one LP recording (Columbia AE 612). Her compositions include:

Piano 

Fusion

Vocal 

"Heimwee" (Longing; text by Justus Latsky)
"I Wonder Why"
"I'll Be Waiting" (text by Mary Astor)
"Onthou Jy nog?" (Do You Remember? text by Justus Latsky)

References

External links 
 Listen to Van Aardt's composition "Heimwee"

Women composers
South African composers
1896 births
1982 deaths
20th-century women
South African expatriates in the United Kingdom